Evaristo de Morais Filho (1914-2016) was a Brazilian lawyer and former member of the Brazilian Academy of Letters. He was born in Rio de Janeiro on July 5, 1914, the son of Antônio Evaristo de Morais and Flávia Dias de Morais, and died on July 22, 2016, in Rio de Janeiro, at the age of 102. He was married to Hileda Flores de Moraes, with whom he had a couple of children.

He did his primary education at the Nilo Peçanha Public School, in São Cristóvão, and junior high at the 28 de Setembro Gymnasium. In 1933, he entered the Faculty of Law, University of Rio de Janeiro, later University of Brazil and, currently, Federal University of Rio de Janeiro. He graduated in 1937. He took further degrees, in philosophy in 1949, as well as a PhD in law in 1953 and in social sciences two years later.

He had a long and successful career as a government lawyer and bureaucrat. He voluntarily retired in December 1966 as attorney for Labor Justice. In 1986 he was part of the Afonso Arinos Commission to draft the Brazilian Constitution. He was part of numerous cultural and legal associations in Brazil and abroad, and also held many teaching posts.

He was the fifth occupant of chair No. 40 at the Brazilian Academy, to which he was elected on March 15, 1984, in succession to Alceu Amoroso Lima. He was received on October 4, 1984, by academic Josué Montello.

References

20th-century Brazilian lawyers
Brazilian centenarians
Men centenarians
1914 births
2016 deaths